The ARIA Albums Chart ranks the best-performing albums and extended plays (EPs) in Australia. Its data, published by the Australian Recording Industry Association, is based collectively on the weekly  digital sales of albums and EPs.

Chart history

See also
2009 in music
ARIA Charts
List of number-one singles of 2009 (Australia)

References

Digital 2009
Australia albums
Number-one albums